The Fox River Valley Conference, or FRVC, was a Wisconsin Interscholastic Athletic Association (WIAA) affiliated high school athletic conference in northeastern Wisconsin. Formed in 1923, it was in existence until the conclusion of the 2007 spring sport season. Afterwards, the conference and its eight members joined with four schools from the Bay Conference to form the Fox River Classic Conference.

Conference history

1923-1970 
The Fox River Valley Conference was established in 1923 by charter members Appleton, Fond du Lac, Green Bay East, Green Bay West, Manitowoc, Oshkosh, and Sheboygan. A year later in 1924, Marinette would join the conference and remain as its eighth member until 1936. In 1938 Sheboygan renamed itself Sheboygan Central due to the upcoming 1939 opening of Sheboygan North. North joined the FRVC that year, bringing its membership back to eight. A minor change occurred in 1960 when Sheboygan Central (and its team name and records) changed its name to Sheboygan South due to the shift of population further from the center of Sheboygan. In 1964, Green Bay Southwest joined the conference followed by Green Bay Preble a year later, the latter having left the now-defunct NEW Conference after 1963. This brought the FRVC membership up to 10 schools. Four years later in 1967, Appleton East incorporated and joined the conference, prompting Appleton to change its name to Appleton West. Nearby Neenah High School opened in 1968, and joined the conference that year, leading the FRVC to peak at 12 member schools.

1970-2006 
A major conference realignment happened in 1970 when Appleton East, Appleton West, Oshkosh, and Neenah left the conference to join up with Kaukauna, Kimberly, and  Menasha, forming the Fox Valley Association. With the loss of four teams, the FRVC brought in Two Rivers, who would leave four years later in 1973 to join the FVA. The conference's schools remained the same until the 1989-1990 school year, when Fond du Lac left the conference to join the Fox Valley Association for all sports except football, not leaving in full until the fall of 1993. The newly-merged Notre Dame Academy made up of Green Bay's Catholic high school population replaced them, keeping membership at eight. The FRVC ended at the conclusion of the 2006-07 school year, when the remaining schools joined Ashwaubenon, Bay Port, De Pere, and Pulaski to form the current Fox River Classic Conference. Of the original seven charter members, the only ones that remained were Green Bay East, Green Bay West, Manitowoc, and Sheboygan (now Sheboygan South).

Member schools

References 

Wisconsin high school sports conferences
1923 establishments in Wisconsin
2007 disestablishments in Wisconsin